Acrobasis comptoniella, the sweetfern leaf casebearer, is a species of snout moth in the genus Acrobasis. It was described by George Duryea Hulst in 1890 and is known from eastern Canada and the United States.

There is one generation per year.

The larvae feed on Comptonia peregrina. Young larvae construct a small silken case and feed on the epidermis and mesophyll of the leaf. Then the larvae move to the stems and construct hibernacula in which they overwinter. After overwintering, they leave the hibernacula and construct frass-covered silken cases, and feed on the leaves. Pupation takes place inside the silken case.

References

Moths described in 1890
Acrobasis
Moths of North America